Triteleia hendersonii, commonly known as Henderson's triteleia, Henderson's stars, or yellow tiger-lily, is a species of flowering plant native to the Pacific Northwest, occurring in Southern Oregon and Northern California.

References

hendersonii
Flora of California
Flora of Oregon
Taxa named by Edward Lee Greene
Flora without expected TNC conservation status